"Flight Path" is the fifteenth episode aired of the first series of UFO - a 1970 British television science fiction series about an alien invasion of Earth. The screenplay, originally entitled "The Sun Always Rises", was written by Ian Scott Stewart and the director was Ken Turner. The episode was filmed between 26 May to 5 June 1969 and aired on the ATV Midlands on 20 January 1971. Though shown as the fifteenth episode, it was actually the third to have been filmed.

The series was created by Gerry Anderson and Sylvia Anderson with Reg Hill, and produced by the Andersons and Lew Grade's Century 21 Productions for Grade's ITC Entertainment company.

Story
Carol, the wife of Paul Roper, a Moonbase operative, is being threatened by Dawson, a SHADO medical operative under alien control. Roper is blackmailed into feeding false information into SID - the satellite that tracks incoming UFOs. The information being sent to SID will allow a UFO to attack Moonbase using heavy sunspot activity as cover. However, SID reports that some of Roper's data is incorrect - either accidentally or deliberately.

Carol is attacked by Dawson, and both are killed. Roper, to defend Moonbase travels out onto the lunar surface with a rocket launcher. He manages to destroy the incoming UFO but the resulting explosion punctures his space suit and he dies from oxygen starvation.

Cast

Starring
 Ed Bishop — Commander Edward Straker
 George Sewell — Col. Alec E. Freeman
 Gabrielle Drake — Lt. Gay Ellis
 Peter Gordeno — Capt. Peter Carlin
 Dolores Mantez — Lt. Nina Barry
 Antonia Ellis — Lt. Joan Harrington	
 Ayshea — Lt. Ayshea Johnson

Also Starring
 George Cole — Paul Roper

Featuring
 Maxwell Shaw — Dr. Shroeder	
 Sonia Fox — Carol Roper	
 Keith Grenville — Dawson, medic 
 David Daker — SHADO guard

Production notes
Locations used for the filming included Neptune House at ATV Elstree Studios, Borehamwood.

References

External links

1971 British television episodes
UFO (TV series) episodes